Bernd Storck, HOM (born 25 January 1963) is a German professional football manager and former player. He is the manager of Belgian club Kortrijk. A defender in his player days, he played for VfL Bochum and Borussia Dortmund.

Club career
Storck made his player debut in the Bundesliga with VfL Bochum. In the summer of 1983, he moved to Borussia Dortmund, where he remained for six years. His biggest success as a pro was winning the 1988–89 DFB-Pokal. He played in 170 Bundesliga matches and scored eight goals.

Managerial career
After ending his playing career, he completed a manager's course and was an assistant coach with Borussia Dortmund, VfB Stuttgart, Hertha BSC, VfL Wolfsburg, and Partizan.

Almaty
In the middle of the 2008 season, he was appointed manager of Kazakh side FC Almaty to help the club avoid relegation in 2008.

Kazakhstan
At the same time he has also managed Kazakhstan national under-21 team.

Storck has complained about the state of the Kazakhstan Premier League and the lack of cooperation he encountered from the local clubs' management.

On 1 March 2010, Storck signed a new one-year contract as coach of Kazakhstan national team. Viktor Katkov, vice-president of Football Federation of Kazakhstan, said that "Our young team are progressing with every match, as shown by the games against Croatia and Ukraine at the end of 2010 FIFA World Cup qualifying. Bernd's football philosophy is a modern one and we are sure it will promote further improvement." Storck added: "I am proud to have the opportunity to continue my work with the Football Federation of Kazakhstan. We have made progress and I am keen to continue working with the team. It is interesting for me to see young footballers develop, and the whole of Kazakh football is developing right now and its status in Europe improving. I hope our work together will bear fruit and that the team can do well for the fans in Euro 2012 qualifying."

He was sacked on 16 October 2010 after a poor start to UEFA Euro 2012 qualifying, losing to Turkey, Austria and Belgium. His final game was a 3–0 defeat against Germany. Sayan Khamitzhanov, general secretary of the Football Federation of Kazakhstan said that "We can see the team progressing because young players are gaining important experience. However, he had a task to collect at least three points in four matches and that was not done. That is why the federation has decided to turn to another coach."

Hungary U20
Storck was the coach for the Hungary national under-20 team at the 2015 FIFA U-20 World Cup. Hungary won their opening match against North Korea which was enough, as they went to lose to Brazil and Nigeria in the other group stage matches. However, in the round of 16, they were knocked out by eventual winners Serbia in a 2–1 extra time loss.

Hungary
On 20 July 2015, he was appointed as the head coach of the Hungary national team after the resignation of Pál Dárdai, who became the manager of the Bundesliga club, Hertha BSC.

On 4 September 2015, Hungary drew 0–0 with Romania at the Groupama Arena, and three days later on 7 September 2015 Hungary drew with Northern Ireland at Windsor Park.

Storck fired the assistant coaches of the Hungary national team on 20 October 2015, including Imre Szabics, István Sallói and József Andrusch. Storck convinced his former teammate, Andreas Möller, to help him preparing the national team against Norway in the UEFA Euro 2016 qualifying play-offs.

Hungary qualified for the UEFA Euro 2016 on 15 November 2015 after 44 years when Hungary was qualified for the UEFA Euro 1972. Hungary beat Norway in the first leg of the UEFA Euro 2016 qualifying play-offs 1–0. The only goal was scored by László Kleinheisler, who had not played a single match in the 2015–16 season in his club Videoton. On the return match, Storck's team beat Norway 2–1 and qualified for the UEFA Euro 2016 finals.

One day after the successful playoff match against Norway, Storck extended his contract with the Hungarian Football Federation until the end of the UEFA Euro 2016.

In an interview with the Hertha BSC's official website, Pál Dárdai, former head coach of Hungary, said that he built the base of the team, while Storck added his part to reach the finals of the UEFA Euro 2016.
 
Storck was asked in an interview with Nemzeti Sport what his best decisions were since his appointment. He said that he would have liked to attack against Romania in the UEFA Euro 2016 qualifying Group F match at the Groupama Arena, to show his philosophy but he decided to defend because he did not have enough time before the match to rebuild the team. He also pointed out that the fact that he had nominated both Gábor Király and Richárd Guzmics in the starting line-up had been a good decision.

On 14 June 2016, Storck managed Hungary in the first group match in a 2–0 victory over Austria at the UEFA Euro 2016 Group F match at the Nouveau Stade de Bordeaux. Three days later on 18 June 2016, his team drew 1–1 with Iceland at the Stade Vélodrome. In the last group match Hungary drew 3–3 with Portugal at Parc Olympique Lyonnais on 22 June 2016.

He offered his resignation on 15 June 2017 after a shocking 1–0 defeat against Andorra in the 2018 FIFA World Cup qualification match. However, the director of the Hungarian Football Federation did not accept his resignation, therefore Storck was confirmed in his position and was a given another opportunity to gain more points during the qualification process.

On 17 October 2017, Storck lost his job in Hungary with mutual agreement.

Genk
On 22 May 2022, Genk announced that Storck and the club had mutually agreed to part ways.

Eupen
For the 2022–23 season, Storck was hired by Eupen.

Awards
On 15 March 2018, Storck was awarded with the Order of Merit of Hungary.

Career statistics

Club

Managerial

Honours
Borussia Dortmund
DFB-Pokal: 1988–89

References

External links

1963 births
People from Herne, North Rhine-Westphalia
Sportspeople from Arnsberg (region)
Footballers from North Rhine-Westphalia
Living people
German footballers
German football managers
German expatriate football managers
Germany under-21 international footballers
VfL Bochum players
Borussia Dortmund players
Bundesliga players
Kazakhstan national football team managers
FK Partizan non-playing staff
Hungary national football team managers
Royal Excel Mouscron managers
Expatriate football managers in Kazakhstan
Expatriate football managers in Hungary
Expatriate football managers in Serbia
Expatriate football managers in Belgium
Expatriate football managers in Slovakia
German expatriate sportspeople in Hungary
German expatriate sportspeople in Serbia
German expatriate sportspeople in Kazakhstan
German expatriate sportspeople in Belgium
German expatriate sportspeople in Slovakia
UEFA Euro 2016 managers
Association football defenders
Cercle Brugge K.S.V. managers
FC DAC 1904 Dunajská Streda managers
K.R.C. Genk managers
K.A.S. Eupen managers
K.V. Kortrijk managers
Slovak Super Liga managers
Belgian Pro League managers